Reigning Champ is a Canadian streetwear and athleisure brand based in Vancouver and founded in 2007 by Craig Atkinson, who also founded wings+horns.

The brand focuses on caps, t-shirts, hoodies, sweatpants, shorts, and tank tops in cotton, heavyweight fleece, and merino wool. Reigning Champ is sold at 130 retailers worldwide.

In June 2021 Reigning Champ entered into a definitive agreement to be acquired by Canadian apparel retailer Aritzia at a valuation of $63 million.

Collaborations
Reigning Champ worked with adidas on designs for shoes, shorts, track pants, sweatpants, knit bomber jackets, and hoodies.

Reigning Champ has collaborated with Everest, Asics Tiger, Major League Soccer, National Basketball Association, and Converse.

See also
A Bathing Ape
Billionaire Boys Club
Virgil Abloh
OVO
Chrome Hearts
Highsnobiety
Visvim

References

Street fashion
Clothing brands of Canada

Companies based in Vancouver